Ron Francis is an artist who paints in a trompe-l'œil style. He was born Ronald Malcolm Francis in Stanmore, Sydney, Australia in September 1954.

In 1974 he moved to Melbourne, Australia where he exhibited with Profile Gallery and later with MCA (Melbourne Contemporary Art Gallery). Around 1988 he began painting trompe-l'œil murals in affiliation with a company called 'Fresco Site Specific Art'.

He moved to South Australia in 1991 and continued to paint trompe-l'œil murals until 2005 when, motivated by illness, he stopped taking commissions and returned to exhibiting fine art. Since 2010 he has been living in Tasmania.

Published in: Trompe L'Oeil Today, written by Ursula E. and Martin Benad. 
The book was originally published in German under the title Illusionsmalerei Heute.

References

External links
 Artist's web site
 Scott Livesey Gallery

Articles 
 Art Terrain.org
 "Avatars signal an uncanny reality" by Robert Nelson
 "Metaphorically Speaking" by Ashley Crawford.

Australian painters
Living people
1954 births
Trompe-l'œil artists